is a song by Japanese singer Yoko Hikasa, whose lyrics were written by  and music composed by . The song was released on May 8, 2013, as the debut single of Hikasa from Pony Canyon, and is best remembered for its use as the ending theme for the first half of season one of Attack on Titan.

Background and production 
The singer Yoko Hikasa had previous experience in voice acting and singing since first working on the April 2009 anime K-On!, but declined offers to debut as an artist. Her opinion reportedly changed after preforming for more major roles, citing specifically her experience of preforming live in the TV anime Ro-Kyu-Bu!. She decided to make her debut with a producer who had repeatedly called her beforehand.

At the production press conference for Attack on Titan on December 8, 2012, Hikasa announced that she would sing the first ending theme for the anime. She followed up with the announcement by stating that "We're working hard on it, and I think it'll be a song that fits the world of the anime". The director of Attack on Titan Tetsurō Araki reportedly supervised the creation of the lyrics to ensure the song matched the theme the show was going for. Two months later on February 8, 2013, the title of the song was announced, and the information that the song would be released to the public from Pony Canyon on May 8 of the same year. It was also announced that CDs would be released for three consecutive months starting after this songs release, with an official website being opened to coincide with the announcement. As for the recording itself, it reportedly only took the short time of three hours to complete.

Release 
The song was released in two versions; the first limited edition (PCCG-01343), which also included a DVD containing the music video for the song, and the regular edition (PCCG-70180). The music video was choreographed to reflect the feelings of Eren Yeager, the main character of the anime, and his desire for freedom.

The single's coupling B-side song was titled "Starting line", and was also a rock number, but faster-paced. The song was originally planned to be part of the album , but ended up not being recorded and was released along with this single.

Live performances 
The song was unveiled for the first time at the Attack on Titan stage event of Anime Contents Expo 2013 held on March 31, 2013, before the song was originally released. The song was also preformed at Animelo Summer Live 2013 held on August 25, 2013, which was also Hikasa's first solo appearance. The song was preformed live for the last time as part of Hikasa's first live tour "Le Tour de Couleur" on October 4, 2014, at Hibiya Open-Air Concert Hall.

Track listing

Personnel 
"Utsukushiki Zankoku na Sekai"
 Hiroyuki Koike – Strings
 Yuya Komoguchi – Guitar

"Starting line"
 Yuki Nara – Guitar
 Riku Sakurai – Bass
  – Drums

Promotion

Magazine 
  Volume 13 (April 25, 2013)
  June 2013 Edition (May 10, 2013)

Radio 
  (May 8, 2013)
  (May 8, 2013)
  (May 11, 2013)

Television 
  #58 (May 10, 2013)

Charts

References 

2013 in Japanese music
2013 singles
2013 songs
Anime songs
Attack on Titan
Japanese-language songs
Pony Canyon singles